Lancelin is a small fishing and tourist town 127 km north of Perth, Western Australia. It is within the Shire of Gingin at the end of Lancelin Road, and a few kilometres away from the scenic highway Indian Ocean Drive (State Route 60).

Lancelin is close to the shipwreck site of the Vergulde Draeck or Gilt Dragon that was wrecked on rocks close to shore in 1656. The town has a permanent population of over 600, and swells to 2,500 during the peak holiday period around Christmas and New Year.

History
The town's name originates from nearby Lancelin Island which was named after P.J. Lancelin the scientific writer by Captain Nicolas Baudin in 1801 during the Frenchman's expedition.

The area was initially a holiday camping place through the 1940s and holiday shacks were probably built in the area during this time, but interest in the area grew as it was designated as a possible port to be utilised by the crayfish or lobster fishery.

Lancelin was gazetted in 1950 and was originally named "Wangaree", the Aboriginal word for fish. The area was renamed in 1953 after a request from the Gingin Road Board.

Two sounding rockets were launched from Lancelin for solar research during the solar eclipse of June 20, 1974.

The Australian military has used the Lancelin Defence Training Area to the north of the town for training exercises since the 1940s.

Recreational
Two islands are located just off the coast in the bay; Edwards Island and Lancelin Island.

Lancelin Island Nature Reserve (500 metres offshore) is managed for the conservation of flora and fauna. The island is an important sanctuary for a variety of breeding seabirds, for several resident landbirds and lizards and for resting sea lions. A variety of marine, wading and land birds may be observed. You can go to this island by boat and it is a popular summer trip. There is a walkway along the island that visitors can walk on to see the wildlife.

Edwards island is prohibited to travel to since it is high class nature reserve.

Kitesurfing and windsurfing are popular in the ocean off Lancelin. Sandboarding and riding on a dune buggy, motorbike or four-wheel drive are popular on the beaches and on the dunes behind the town.

Every March the annual colour blast event is held on the beach.

The Lancelin District Community Association is the holder of the Guinness World Record for the largest off-road convoy.

Climate
Lancelin has a hot-summer mediterranean climate that is consistently warm throughout the year, resembling a typical subtropical climate but with a dry summer.

<div style="width:91%;">

Gallery

References

External links

Walkabout - Lancelin
Lancelin Island Nature Reserve
Lancelin - News

Coastal towns in Western Australia
Fishing communities in Australia
Shire of Gingin